The 2010 London Marathon was the 30th running of the annual marathon race in London, England, which took place on Sunday, 25 April. The elite men's race was won by Ethiopia's Tsegaye Kebede in a time of 2:05:19 hours and the elite women's race was won by Aselefech Mergia, also of Ethiopia, in 2:22:38.

In the wheelchair races, Canada's Josh Cassidy (1:35:21) and Japan's Wakako Tsuchida (1:52:33) won the men's and women's divisions, respectively.

Around 163,000 people applied to enter the race: 51,378 had their applications accepted and 36,956 started the race. A total of 36,553 runners, 24,423 men and 12,130 women, finished the race.

In the under-17 Mini Marathon, the 3-mile non-disabled and wheelchair events were won by Jack Gray (14:29), Jessica Judd (16:39), Daniel Lucker (12:36) and Hannah Cockroft (15:48).

Summary
The men's event was won by Tsegaye Kebede of Ethiopia with a time of 2:05:19 and the women's event by Aselefech Mergia of Ethiopia with a time of 2:22:38, a position moved up after numerous disqualifications for doping. Kebede became the first non-Kenyan to win the men's event in seven years. The men's wheelchair event was won by Josh Cassidy of Canada with a time of 1:35:21 while Wakako Tsuchida of Japan won the women's wheelchair event.

The event saw 74 world record attempts, including one involving 34 runners bound together by bungee cord to form a "human caterpillar", among whom was Princess Beatrice of York, the fifth in line to the British throne, who became the first royal family member to participate in the marathon. Of the attempts, 41 were successful. The marathon was sponsored by Sir Richard Branson's Virgin Group, having signed a five-year contract, taking over from previous sponsors, Flora. Branson also ran the marathon for his first time.

Prior to the marathon, there had been concerns that the air-travel disruption caused by the 2010 eruptions of Eyjafjallajökull could disrupt the event, though many athletes from outside of the United Kingdom were brought in by an aircraft specially chartered from Spain.

Both of the 2009 winners, Samuel Wanjiru and Irina Mikitenko, were present to defend their titles. However, neither athlete managed to finish the race as they both stopped around the mid-way point.

Results

Elite men

Elite women

Wheelchair men

Wheelchair women

References

Results
Men's Results. Association of Road Racing Statisticians. Retrieved 2020-04-25.
Women's Results. Association of Road Racing Statisticians. Retrieved 2020-04-25.

External links

Official website

Marathon
London Marathon
London Marathon
London Marathon